John Daly is an American media personality.

Journalism
A graduate of Providence College, Daly worked for the Norwich Bulletin, WCTI-TV in New Bern, North Carolina, WPRI-TV in Providence, Rhode Island, and WFSB-TV in Hartford, Connecticut before becoming the main anchor, then newsroom managing editor for KTNV-13 in Las Vegas in 1990. From 1996 until 2000, Daly hosted Real TV, a nationally syndicated program. He also was the host of House Detective on the HGTV cable network and of a web based show for entrepreneurs called Real Money Show which also appeared on TV4U.Com and KSHOTV.Com.

In 2011, Daly joined New England Cable News as the network's primetime co-anchor. In 2017, Daly was inducted into the Nevada Broadcasters Hall of Fame.

Business
From 2007 to 2009 Daly was the vice president of business development for BNY Mellon Wealth Management for Southern Nevada. He then served as the vice president of broadcast operations for the World Series of Golf.

References

External links 
 HGTV "House Detective" John Daly bio
 John Daly's site (including podcasts and blogs)
 John Daly's newest web based television show, Real Money Show

American male journalists
Television anchors from Boston
Television anchors from Las Vegas
Living people
Place of birth missing (living people)
Providence College alumni
1955 births